Escape to Paradise is a 1939 American film directed by Erle C. Kenton.

Escape to Paradise may also refer to:

Film
 Escape to Paradise (1960 film), the original Filipino title of Lost Battalion

Music
Escape to Paradise, a classical album by Daniel Hope, 2014
"Escape to Paradise", a song by DJ Quicksilver, 1998